Ein böses Märchen ...aus tausend finsteren Nächten (German for An evil fairytale from thousand darkly nights) is the German hard rock band Böhse Onkelz 14th album. It was released in 2000 under the new, from the Onkelz founded label rule23 Recordings.

Track listing
Onkelz 2000
Dunkler Ort (Dark place)
Exitus
Schutzgeist der Scheiße (Guardian spirit of shit)
Lüge (Lie)
Knast (Prison)
C'est la vie (That's life)
Danke (Thanks)
Es ist wie es ist (It is how it is)
Zuviel (Too much)
Gesichter des Todes (Faces of death)
Panamericana (Instrumental)

Single

Dunkler Ort

Track listing
Dunkler Ort
Schutzgeist der Scheiße
Das Signum des Verrats (re-recording from the song of the album Böse Menschen - Böse Lieder)

References

Böhse Onkelz albums
2000 albums
German-language albums